1134 Kepler, provisional designation , is a stony asteroid and eccentric Mars-crosser from the asteroid belt, approximately 4 kilometers in diameter. It was discovered on 25 September 1929, by German astronomer Max Wolf at Heidelberg Observatory in southwest Germany. It is named after Johannes Kepler.

Orbit and classification 

Kepler orbits the Sun at a distance of 1.4–3.9 AU once every 4 years and 5 months (1,601 days). Its orbit has an eccentricity of 0.47 and an inclination of 15° with respect to the ecliptic. The body's observation arc begins at Heidelberg, the night after its official discovery observation.

Physical characteristics 

In the SMASS taxonomy, Kepler  is a stony S-type asteroid.

Diameter and albedo 

Its diameter has not been estimated by any of the prominent space-based surveys such as the Infrared Astronomical Satellite IRAS (1982), the Japanese Akari satellite (2006), NASA's Wide-field Infrared Survey Explorer (2009) or its subsequent NEOWISE mission (2013). Based on a generic magnitude-to-diameter conversion, Keplers diameter is between 3 and 8 kilometer for an absolute magnitude of 14.2 and an assumed albedo in the range of 0.25 to 0.05. Since its spectral type falls into the class of stony asteroids, which have an averaged standard albedo around 0.20, Keplers generic diameter is close to 4 kilometers, as the higher a body's albedo (reflectivity), the shorter its diameter at a fixed absolute magnitude (brightness).

Keplers rotation period is 0.1148 day, a pretty common value for asteroids of this size.

Naming 

This minor planet was named on the commemoration of the 300th death anniversary of astronomer Johannes Kepler (1571–1630), best known for his laws of planetary motion. Kepler is also honored by a lunar and Martian crater, by Kepler Dorsum – a mountain ridge on the Martian moon Phobos, and by Kepler's Supernova.

Naming citation was first published in 1930, in the astronomy journal Astronomical Notes (AN 240, 135). The space observatory Kepler and its many discovered exoplanets also bear his name (see also Kepler (disambiguation)).

References

External links 
 Asteroid Lightcurve Database (LCDB), query form (info )
 Dictionary of Minor Planet Names, Google books
 Asteroids and comets rotation curves, CdR – Observatoire de Genève, Raoul Behrend
 Discovery Circumstances: Numbered Minor Planets (1)-(5000) – Minor Planet Center
 
 

Mars-crossing asteroids
Kepler
Kepler
S-type asteroids (SMASS)
19290925